Miles John Turpin is a former linebacker in the National Football League.

Biography
Turpin was born Miles John Turpin on May 15, 1964 in Minneapolis, Minnesota.

Career
Turpin was a member of the Green Bay Packers during the 1986 NFL season. The following season, he played with the Tampa Bay Buccaneers.

He played at the collegiate level at the University of California, Berkeley.

See also
List of Green Bay Packers players

References

Players of American football from Minneapolis
Green Bay Packers players
Tampa Bay Buccaneers players
American football linebackers
University of California, Berkeley alumni
California Golden Bears football players
Living people
1964 births
National Football League replacement players